The Ambassador of Malaysia to the Republic of Ireland is the head of Malaysia's diplomatic mission to Ireland. The position has the rank and status of an Ambassador Extraordinary and Plenipotentiary and is based in the Embassy of Malaysia, Dublin.

List of heads of mission

Ambassadors to Ireland

See also

 Ireland–Malaysia relations

References 

 
Ireland
Malaysia
Ireland and the Commonwealth of Nations
Malaysia and the Commonwealth of Nations